Graham Benton is a British indoor rower. He has won the British Rowing Indoor Championships 12 times and the World Indoor Rowing Championships six. While Benton is primarily an indoor rower, he has participated in outdoor rowing competitions, especially for charity.

Athletic career
Benton joined his first indoor rowing competition at age 31. In 2004, Graham Benton became the first non-water rower to win the men's open heavyweight event at the British Indoor Rowing Championships at 5:53.5. He went on to win this title again in 2005 (5:46.9), 2006 (5:46.7), 2007, 2008, 2010 (5:50.8), 2011 (5:46), 2012, 2013 (5:52.4), 2014 (5:52.4), 2015 (5:55:6), 2016 (5:55), 2017 (5:55.7), and 2018 Benton also won the 30-39 year heavyweight class World Indoor Rowing Championships in 2004 (5:51.40), 2005 (5:53.60), and 2006 (5:46.40) and in the 40-49 heavyweight class in 2016 (5:48.3), 2017 (5:48), and 2018 (5:54).

In 2012, he set a new British record in the 35-39 heavyweight men's class at the British Indoor Rowing Championships (5:50.1), a title previously held by Sir Steve Redgrave since 1998. In 2014, he held the British outright record at 5:42.5 and in 2017, he had the fastest time in the men's heavyweight open 2000m at the Welsh Indoor Rowing Championships. He was a Henley Royal Regatta finalist in outdoor rowing in 2007, 2008, and 2012. He was given a Lifetime Achievement Award by Concept2 in 2010.

Benton previously trained with coach Eddie Fletcher in the ARA World Class Start Program and has been part of Team Taurus, MAD Team IRC, and Tideway Scullers School.

Personal life
Benton works as a sales leader for Hewlett Packard Enterprise UK. He was formerly an "elite-level" cricket bowler and is an alumnus of King's School, Chester. In 2017, he was based in Cambridge.

References

British male rowers
People educated at The King's School, Chester
Living people
Sportspeople from Cheshire
Year of birth missing (living people)